The Red Death was an American extreme metal band from Bath, New York.

History
Formed in 2002 after the demise of Another Day Forgotten by singer Paul Hamblin, guitarist Josh Williammee, and drummer Graham Mitchell, the original lineup was rounded out by guitarist Brian VanGelder and bassist Karl Janovec. In 2003 Bryan left the band and was replaced by Nate Golia, a guitarist from nearby Rochester, NY, formerly of another metal band, Warblade. That summer they embarked on their first short tour, with Virginia screamo band Shadows and the Silence (whose bass player, a Bath native, Dominic Mastronunzino, would replace Karl Janovec the following summer). While on a three-week tour with New Jersey's With Resistance, the band began speaking with Metal Blade Records and signed with them the following fall; however, Nate left the band to concentrate on school and was replaced by Aaron Conti, formerly of If Hope Dies. After signing to Metal Blade, the band embarked on several extended, full-U.S. tours with bands such as From a Second Story Window, The Acacia Strain, Undying, Through the Eyes of the Dead, Arsis, and Into the Moat. Their first album External Frames of Reference was released in 2005 by the Metal Blade label. In 2006 they were dropped by Metal Blade Records.

With a new bassist (Jordan Rathbun), the band recorded a new demo for prospective labels.  They were signed by UK record label Siege of Amida.  In a distribution deal with Ferret Records, Siege of Amida released The Red Death's second and final full-length CD, titled "Godmakers" in early 2008.  That summer the band decided to call it quits. Their "final" show was Halloween night (2008) at The Little Pickle in Bath, NY. The Red Death reunited for a single show on Halloween night 2009 at the Half Penny Pub in Syracuse, NY.

Members

Final line-up
Paul Hamblin - vocals (2002-2008)
Aaron Conti - guitar (2002-2008)
Graham Mitchell - drums (2002-2008)
Mark Kelley - guitar (2007-2008)
Jordan Rathbun - bass (2007-2008)

Former members
Joshua Williammee - guitar, bass
Bryan VanGelder - guitar
Nate Golia - guitar
Dominic Mastronunzino - bass
Jed Shugars - bass
Jackson Portwood - bass (2005)
Karl Janovec - bass

Discography 
Aftertaste of the Emaciated (EP, Crooked Halo Records, 2004)
External Frames of Reference (Album, Metal Blade Records, 2005)
Godmakers (Album, Ferret Music, 2008)

See also
 List of death metal bands

References

Metalcore musical groups from New York (state)
Death metal musical groups from New York (state)
Musical groups established in 2002
Musical groups disestablished in 2008
American deathcore musical groups
Metal Blade Records artists
2002 establishments in New York (state)